Oleg Mikhailovich Nechayev (born 25 June 1971) is a Russian professional football coach and a former player. He is an assistant manager with FC Rubin Kazan.

Club career
He made his professional debut in the Soviet Second League in 1988 for FC Rubin Kazan. He played 2 games in the UEFA Cup 1994–95 for FC Rotor Volgograd.

Honours
 Russian Premier League runner-up: 1993.
 Russian Premier League bronze: 2003.
 Russian Cup finalist: 1995.

References

1971 births
People from Vysokogorsky District
Sportspeople from Tatarstan
Living people
Soviet footballers
Russian footballers
Association football forwards
Association football midfielders
FC Rubin Kazan players
FC Rotor Volgograd players
FC Amkar Perm players
FC Lada-Tolyatti players
Soviet Second League players
Soviet Second League B players
Russian First League players
Russian Premier League players
Russian Second League players
Russian football managers
FC Urozhay Krasnodar managers
Russian expatriate football managers
Expatriate football managers in Kazakhstan